Overture to Death is a detective novel by Ngaio Marsh; it is the eighth novel to feature Roderick Alleyn, and was first published in 1939.  The plot concerns a murder during an amateur theatrical performance in a Dorset village, which Alleyn and his colleague Fox are dispatched from Scotland Yard to investigate and duly solve.

The novel is a classic example of what crime writer Colin Watson termed "The Mayhem Parva School" of genteel English village murder mystery from the "Golden Age" between the world wars. Despite the ingeniously gruesome murder method, it is essentially a social comedy of manners, with the amusingly awful rivalry between two ageing spinster ladies to dominate their cosy little society of village, church and charitable affairs, each performing a favourite piano piece on every possible occasion, reminiscent of E F Benson's Mapp and Lucia novels of the same period.

It is the third novel in which Alleyn's love interest, the painter Agatha Troy features. Although she does not appear, she is engaged to marry Alleyn, who writes to her, outlining the kind of marriage he hopes they will enjoy. By the next book, they are married. To make way for this new direction in her detective's progress, his original 'Watson', the journalist Nigel Bathgate makes one of his final appearances in this novel.

Plot Summary

In the picturesque village of Vale-of-Pen-Cuckoo, tensions are running high amongst the seven people who gather to discuss a charity production to raise funds for a new church piano. The local squire, Jocelyn Jerningham, disapproves of his son's, Henry, relationship with Dinah Copeland, the rector's daughter.  The Jerninghams are somewhat impoverished nobles and Henry needs to marry a wealthy woman in order to maintain the estate of Pen Cuckoo.  Jocelyn's cousin, Eleanor Prentice, is a sexless spinster who is madly in love with Rector Copeland and also disapproves of Henry and Dinah's relationship.  Miss Prentice's best friend, Idris Campanula, is also in love with the rector and the two spinsters aren't always on friendly terms.  They both disapprove of newcomer Selia Ross who is apparently having an affair with Dr. Templett who has an invalid wife.  When Mrs. Ross suggests they put on a production of "Shop Windows", everyone is in agreement except the two spinsters who are outnumbered.

Rehearsals do not go well as several actors refuse to take the production seriously and Miss Prentice and Miss Campanula argue over who should play the opening overture.  Eventually, it is decided that Miss Prentice will open the play with 'Venetian Suite' by Ethelbert Nevin.  However, she develops a painful finger and has to drop out just minutes before the production begins.  Miss Campanula sits down at the piano to play Sergei Rachmaninoff's familiar Prelude in C-sharp minor and is promptly shot dead by a Colt 32 that was hidden in the piano.

Chief Inspector Roderick Alleyn investigates and quickly learns a mischievous child named Georgie Biggins had, two days prior, rigged the piano with his 'Twiddletoy' and water pistol so that water would squirt whenever someone pressed the soft pedal.  However, the water pistol was replaced with Jocelyn's revolver.  It seems the switch happened sometime on Saturday, the day before the murder.  Everyone knew about Jocelyn's revolver and anyone could have sneaked into the rectory hall and the rig the piano.  However, a young volunteer tells Alleyn that she played the piano and used the soft pedal not an hour before Miss Campanula was murdered.  But the hall was crowded with guests soon afterward and no one messed with the piano at that time.

Alleyn wonders if the intended victim was Miss Prentice.  She only backed down from the piano solo just minutes before the murder.  Everyone also has a stronger motive to kill her over Miss Campanula. Miss Prentice witnessed Henry and Dinah in flagrante delicto and threatened to tell their fathers about it.  She had wicked fights with Miss Campanula and often told the rector mean things about her friend under the guise of making a confession.  She hated Mrs. Ross.  However, everyone also has a motive to kill Miss Campanula.  The rector is the main heir to her estate which makes Dinah a rich woman, rich enough to marry Henry Jerningham.  Miss Campanula wrote a threatening letter to Mrs. Ross over her affair with Dr. Templett which both of them lied about.   

Alleyn concludes the intended victim was always Miss Campanula.  The revolver was rigged in such a way that the safety catch could easily be turned on and off.  Had the intended victim been Miss Prentice, the murderer could have easily switched the safety off quickly and easily even in full view of the audience.  Since the victim was always intended to be Miss Campanula, Alleyn reasons her killer can only be Miss Prentice.  Only Miss Prentice could have known she would drop out of the piano solo, even though she had resisted doing so for days.  Miss Prentice always hated Miss Campanula and things came to a head on Saturday evening when she misinterpreted a hug Miss Campanula gave to the rector.  This sent her into a tailspin and decided to murder her alleged best friend. Although the Jerninghams suggest Miss Prentice may be insane, Alleyn disagrees and thinks she is just playing up for leniency.

Characters
Chief Inspector Roderick Alleyn
Inspector Fox
Nigel Bathgate
Sergeants Bailey and Thompson
Jocelyn Jerningham - the local squire
Henry Jerningham - his son
Eleanor Prentice - his spinster cousin
Walter Copeland - the rector
Dinah Copeland - the rector's daughter
Idris Campanula - a wealthy spinster
William Templett - the local doctor
Selia Ross - an attractive widow
Georgie Biggins - a mischievous child

Commentary

Biographer Margaret Lewis describes how "her extended stays with the Rhodes family in various country houses... gave Ngaio the material she needed for several novels. Overture to Death is set in the kind of idiosyncratic country village that she knew well. Character dominates the novel... [T]he New Statesman reviewer accused the writer of treating crime fiction 'as a convenient vase to arrange her characters in'. Other reviewers admired her talent for developing character and were soon recommending that she forget detection and concentrate on straight fiction instead."

In her more recent Marsh biography, Joanne Drayton discusses at some length Overture to Death 's central theme of love pursued, frustrated or fulfilled, contrasting the forbidden Henry-Dinah romance with the toxic Idris-Eleanor rivalry for the Rector's affections. Drayton also compares Alleyn's developing love interest in Troy with the late 1930s development of parallel love interests into marriage for Dorothy L Sayers' Lord Peter Wimsey and Margery Allingham's Albert Campion, whereas Agatha Christie's series detectives Hercule Poirot and Jane Marple are characters definitively unsusceptible to a credible love interest, which Agatha Christie is quoted as finding "a terrible bore in detective stories".

The novel ends with Alleyn holding an unopened letter from Troy and asking Bathgate a question. ' "If one could send every grand passion to the laboratory, do you suppose, in each resulting formula, we should find something of Dinah and Henry's young idyll, something of Templett's infatuation, something of Miss P.'s madness, and even something of old Jernigham's foolishness?" "Who knows?" said Nigel. "Not I," said Alleyn. '

Reception

In a 1945 article in The New Yorker, "Who Cares Who Killed Roger Ackroyd?", the American literary critic Edmund Wilson (1895-1972) strongly criticized the artificiality and literary shortcomings of the classic Golden Age whodunit. This is quoted in many subsequent studies of crime fiction, including Howard Haycraft's 1946 The Art of the Mystery Story. Wilson singles out the Queens of Crime of the "English genteel" school, including Dorothy L. Sayers and Ngaio Marsh, whose The Nine Tailors and Overture To Death respectively are subjected to criticism. Thus Wilson on Overture To Death:

"It would be impossible, I should think, for anyone with the faintest feeling for words to describe the unappetizing sawdust which Miss Marsh has poured into her pages as 'excellent prose' or as prose at all except in the sense that distinguishes prose from verse. And here again the book is mostly padding. There is the notion that you could commit a murder by rigging up a gun in a piano, so that the victim will shoot himself when he presses down the pedal, but this embedded in the dialogue and doings of a lot of faked-up English country people who are even more tedious than those of The Nine Tailors. "

In his 1979 study of Agatha Christie, A Talent To Deceive, the English crime writer Robert Barnard vigorously countered Wilson's critique of Sayers, Christie, Marsh, Allingham, Chandler, Hammett, Stout et al:

"They were all, he concluded, beneath contempt: the stories were childish in the extreme - ridiculous tissues of improbabilities: the characterisation was at best conventional: the writing was dreadful beyond belief... This was all very well - and granted [ Wilson's ] point of view one might agree with most or all of his strictures. But he chose to call one of his essays on the subject Who Cares Who Killed Roger Ackroyd? and this is a question that ought to have given him furiously to think... [ With reference to Christie's eye-watering sales figures ] if the answer is not 'everybody', it is as near to it as any writer in our time has come. But of course mere popularity will not still the voices of those who, like Edmund Wilson, find her books trashy."

References

Roderick Alleyn novels
1939 British novels
British detective novels
British mystery novels
Novels set in London
Novels set in Dorset
Geoffrey Bles books